The 1918–19 Kansas Jayhawks men's basketball team represented the University of Kansas during the 1918–19 college men's basketball season. Future member of the Hall of Fame Dutch Lonborg was retroactively named an All-American by the Helms Foundation, making him the third Jayhawk to earn the honor.

Roster
Roy Bennett
John Bunn
Byron Frederick
Marvin Harms
Howard Laslett
Arthur Lonborg
Edward Mason
Kelsey Mathews
Howard Miller

Schedule and results

References

Kansas
Kansas Jayhawks men's basketball seasons
Kansas Jayhawks Men's Basketball Team
Kansas Jayhawks Men's Basketball Team